is a Japanese footballer currently playing as a defender for Oita Trinita.

Career statistics

Club
.

Notes

References

External links

1997 births
Living people
Association football people from Osaka Prefecture
Kansai University alumni
Japanese footballers
Association football defenders
J1 League players
Oita Trinita players